Im Nayeon is the debut extended play (EP) by South Korean singer Nayeon of the girl group Twice. It was released through JYP Entertainment and Republic Records on June 24, 2022. The EP contains seven tracks, including the lead single "Pop!" and collaborations with Felix from Stray Kids and Wonstein. The EP is primarily a pop record that blends genres such as R&B, dance, disco, jazz, and ballad.

Background 
On May 19, 2022, it was announced via Twice's social media pages that Nayeon would release her first extended play, titled Im Nayeon, on June 24. It was accompanied by a teaser image featuring a close-up shot of what appears to be a coffee table, with trinkets such as bottles of nail polish, jewellery and a cup of tea strewn across. Specifics about Im Nayeon and its impending release were also unveiled in the following weeks, with worldwide pre-orders for the mini-album starting on May 24.

Composition 
The record opens with the lead single, "Pop!" which described as a song that "conjures classic Twice" It is a pop and bubblegum song that takes inspiration from the sounds of second-generation bubblegum K-pop. Characterized by bright beats, live instruments such as bass, guitar, and horn, winding high notes, and a variety of ad libs. Its lyrics revolve around "a bold declaration of confidence." Where the protagonist sings about her ability to capture her lover's heart with ease. The lyrics "explored the flirtatious and accrescent sentiments of romance using onomatopoeia to portray popping a lover’s heart like a bubble." The second track "No Problem" is an english-language collab with Felix of Stray Kids. It is a disco-pop song, described as "a comforting song about the power of love." Followed with the second collaboration "Love Countdown" with the south korean rapper Wonstein. It is an R&B and pop track that incorporate "summery" guitar riffs, synths and "a smooth tempo." Its lyrics revolve around "Nayeon waiting for someone to admit their feelings for her in a very coy fashion, urging the person to hurry as she’s already at the starting line, while Wonstein’s verse provides a great counterpart in showing the other side’s perspective in waiting for her to approach him. It’s a fun and playful track whose lesson is that hesitation won’t get you very far in pursuing your feelings." Furth track "Candyfloss", co- composed and produced  Jade Thirlwall of British girl group Little Mix. It is a 80s-Inspired pop track that features synths and saxophone. Some criticize described it as "an extension of the typical Twice image." 

Nayeon participated in writing the lyrics for "Love Countdown" and is credited as the sole lyricist on "All or Nothing", which she wrote while on tour with Twice in the United States. It talks about all the things that helped her overcome hardships during the course of her life.

Title 
The album's title, Im Nayeon, is a play on the near-identical spelling of the artist's last name and the contraction "I'm".

Critical reception 

On Metacritic, which assigns a normalized rating out of 100 to reviews from professional publications, Im Nayeon received a mean score of 78 based on 5 reviews, indicating "generally favorable reviews".

NME's Rhian Daly gives the album three stars out of five writing, "Nayeon’s debut solo release contains many layers, not least in its title. Whether you look at it as simply the singer’s name, or as an apostrophe-less declaration of “I’m Nayeon”, it feels like an introduction. And, as introductions go, this record makes for a warm and welcoming one – even if it doesn’t stray too much from what you’d expect."

Beats Per Minute's Early. JT wrote "IM NAYEON – whether you want to consider it a natural extension of Twice's massive discography or a separate entity – is a very strong debut that impresses and makes you circle back to replay the moment the last song is finished. Both fun and grounded.

Sputnik Music's Jesper L gives the album four stars out of five, describing the EP as "glossy sweetness," writing, "it’s a delightful 20 minutes of sugary catchiness, and as long as you don’t spend too much time thinking about the specificities of its ingredients you’ll find yourself enjoying a delightful rush."

Uproxx including the album on their list of best pop album of 2022. Prising its way of blending pop production with various genres, writing, "IM NAYEON has set the standard for what’s to come and what to look out for with future solo projects from twice".

Commercial performance 
Ahead of its release, the Im Nayeon surpassed over 500,000 pre-orders, the highest number of pre-orders by a female soloist thus far in 2022. The EP debuted and peaked at number 1 on the South Korean Gaon Album Chart. On the US Billboard 200, the EP peaked at number 7, making Nayeon the first South Korean soloist to enter the top 10 and highest selling female act of the year upon its release. In Japan, it reached number 7 on the Japanese Digital Albums chart and number 19 on the Japanese Hot Albums chart. In Europe, it charted in Finland, Poland, and the United Kingdom.

In August 2022, the EP received a Platinum certification from the Korea Music Content Association (KMCA) for selling over 250,000 units in South Korea.

Track listing

Charts

Weekly charts

Monthly charts

Year-end charts

Certifications and sales 

|}

Release history

See also 
 List of certified albums in South Korea
 List of Circle Album Chart number ones of 2022
 List of K-pop albums on the Billboard charts

References 

2022 debut EPs
JYP Entertainment EPs
Korean-language EPs
Republic Records EPs
Pop albums by South Korean artists